Old Hardy County Courthouse, also known as "First" Hardy County Courthouse, is a historic courthouse building located at Moorefield, Hardy County, West Virginia. It was built in two sections, the first built in 1792-93 and the extension added about 1833. It is an "L"-shaped brick building painted white. The original section has Federal style detailing and features a cupola atop the gable roof. The building was remodeled in 1972. It served as the courthouse and clerk's office until the 1860s. It was subsequently occupied by a girls' day and boarding school and offices.

Following a remodel by architect Marjorie Pierce in 1972, it was listed on the National Register of Historic Places in 1974.

References

Government buildings completed in 1793
National Register of Historic Places in Hardy County, West Virginia
Courthouses on the National Register of Historic Places in West Virginia
Buildings and structures in Hardy County, West Virginia
County courthouses in West Virginia
Federal architecture in West Virginia
Former courthouses in West Virginia
1793 establishments in Virginia